Alejandro "Álex" Revuelta Montero (born 16 April 2000) is a Spanish professional footballer who plays as a central defender for Getafe CF B.

Club career
Revuelta was born in Jerez de la Frontera, Cádiz, Andalusia, and represented Xerez CD, Xerez Deportivo FC, Málaga CF, Atlético Sanluqueño CF and Cádiz CF as a youth. On 23 July 2019, he was loaned to former side Xerez, being assigned to the first team in Tercera División.

In September 2020, Revuelta moved to fellow fourth tier side CD Guadalajara. In August of the following year, he joined Getafe CF and was initially assigned to the reserves in Tercera División RFEF.

Revuelta made his first team – and La Liga – debut on 18 September 2022, coming on as a late substitute for Gastón Álvarez in a 2–0 away win over CA Osasuna.

References

External links

2000 births
Living people
Footballers from Jerez de la Frontera
Spanish footballers
Association football defenders
La Liga players
Tercera División players
Tercera Federación players
Cádiz CF B players
Xerez CD footballers
CD Guadalajara (Spain) footballers
Getafe CF B players
Getafe CF footballers